Persis William-Mensah (born 15 June 1996) is a Ghanaian athlete. She competed in the women's 4 × 100 metres relay event at the 2019 World Athletics Championships. In 2019, she also represented Ghana at the 2019 African Games held in Rabat, Morocco. She competed in the women's 100 metres.

References

External links

1996 births
Living people
Ghanaian female sprinters
Place of birth missing (living people)
World Athletics Championships athletes for Ghana
Athletes (track and field) at the 2019 African Games
African Games competitors for Ghana
20th-century Ghanaian women
21st-century Ghanaian women